Lampsilis streckeri, the speckled pocketbook, is a species of freshwater mussel in the family Unionidae, the river mussels. It is endemic to Arkansas in the United States, where it is threatened by habitat loss. It is a federally listed endangered species of the United States.

This mussel is about 8 centimeters long. It is dark yellow to brown and has chevron-shaped spots and chainlike rays. It is sexually dimorphic, the females being more rounded at the posterior.

When this species was placed on the Endangered Species List it was limited to a six-mile stretch of the Middle Fork of the Little Red River in Arkansas. The damming of the river to form the Greers Ferry Reservoir changed the hydrology of the river, altering the habitat.

Since its listing several additional populations have been discovered in the river.

See also 
 Yellowcheek darter: Also endemic to the Little Red River (Arkansas)

References

External links
Encyclopedia of Arkansas History & Culture entry

streckeri
Endemic fauna of Arkansas
Molluscs of the United States
Bivalves described in 1927
ESA endangered species
Taxonomy articles created by Polbot
Little Red River (Arkansas)